This is a list of museums in Ponce, Puerto Rico. Both, museums in the city proper as well as Ponce's rural areas are listed. One unique feature about Ponce museums is that the majority of them are housed in historic structures listed in the National Register of Historic Places. In those cases, the listing below also provided that NRHP registry number.

Museum list summary table
Note: The table that follows lists museums by their year of founding, that is, their year of opening. A listing sorted by any of the other fields can be obtained by clicking on the header of the field. For example, clicking on "Barrio" will sort museums by their barrio location.

Key:
C. = Calle (street)
NB = Northbound
SB = Southbound
WB = Westbound
EB = Eastbound
Unk = Unknown
N/A = Not applicable

See also

 List of museums in Puerto Rico

References

Museums in Ponce, Puerto Rico
Puerto Rican culture
Neoclassical architecture in Puerto Rico
museums
Museums, Ponce
Puerto Rico, Ponce
Ponce